Susannah Fowle (born 1958 in Melbourne, Australia) is an Australian actress.

Film
She is best known for her role as Laura Tweedle Rambotham in the film The Getting of Wisdom (after the novel The Getting of Wisdom by Henry Handel Richardson), about which the 2006 documentary Telling Schoolgirl Tales: The Making of 'The Getting of Wisdom''' was created, and her role in the television series Prisoner as Lori Young (later renamed as "Lori Maynard").

Theatre
She performed on stage in The Boiling Frog at the Nimrod Theatre in 1984. She also worked for the State Theatre Company of Northern Territory in 1987 and performed in The Sentimental Bloke and Trumpets and Raspberries''.

References

External links
 

Australian film actresses
Australian television actresses
1958 births
Living people
Actresses from Melbourne